The 2015–16 Missouri Tigers women's basketball team represents the University of Missouri in the 2015–16 NCAA Division I women's basketball season. The Tigers were led by sixth year head coach Robin Pingeton. They play their games at Mizzou Arena and are members of the Southeastern Conference. They finished the season 22–10, 8–8 in SEC play to finish in a 3 way tie for seventh place. They lost in the second round of the SEC women's tournament to Auburn. They received an at-large to the NCAA women's tournament, which was their first trip since 2006 where they defeated BYU in the first round before losing to Texas in the second round.

Roster

Schedule and results

|-
!colspan=12 style="background:black; color:white;"| Exhibition

|-
!colspan=12 style="background:black; color:white;"| Non-conference regular season

|-
!colspan=12 style="background:black; color:white;"| SEC regular season

|-
!colspan=12 style="background:black; color:white;"| SEC Women's Tournament

|-
!colspan=12 style="background:black; color:white;"| NCAA Women's Tournament

Rankings
2015–16 NCAA Division I women's basketball rankings

See also
2015–16 Missouri Tigers men's basketball team

References

Missouri Tigers women's basketball seasons
Missouri
Missouri
Missouri Tigers
Missouri Tigers